The La Trobe Student Union (LTSU) is a representative body for students at La Trobe University. The LTSU is located at the Bundoora campus in the Agora. The LTSU is made up of elected student representatives who provide advocacy, services, events and support for all La Trobe Students. The representatives include President, Education Vice President, General Secretary, Postgraduate Officer, Education Public Affairs Officer, Welfare Officer, Women's Officer, Queer Officer, People of Colour Officer, Aboriginal and Torres Strait Islander Officer, Disabilities Officer, Social Justice Officer, Activities Officer and 7 General Members of Council.

The LTSU also operates Rabelais (student paper), student advocacy and legal service.

The LTSU was formed in 2011 with a merger of the Guild, the SRC and the La Trobe University Postgraduate Association. It also incorporated Mature Aged Student Organisation (formerly the Part Time, Evening Mature Student Organisation) and International Student Association as associated bodies along with the regional bodies the Mildura Student Association and the Shepparton Student Association.

LTSU Wedge-tailed eagle totem logo is designed by Chuan-Zui Choo.

History 
During the 1960s and 1970s, La Trobe, along with Monash, was considered to have the most politically active student body of any university in Australia. The Communist Party of Australia (Marxist-Leninist) was a prominent organisation on campus, often with the cover of a front organisation sometimes encouraging the name 'La Trot'. The following La Trobe alumni were all good friends at the time and took part in student politics: Bill Kelty from the ACTU and AFL Commissioner, former Treasurer Tony Sheehan, Don Watson, Geoff Walsh (Bob Hawke's press secretary, High-profile union officials Brian Boyd, John Cummins and Garry Weaven, former federal treasury official and former Westpac CEO, David Morgan. Some other Labor figures and people from the left side of politics include Mary Delahunty, Phil Cleary and Michael Danby. Despite the general socialist/leftist atmosphere several conservative corporate/business figures and Liberal party members have come from La Trobe, including Victorian Liberal Party Leader Matthew Guy who, in March 2018, apologised for a homophobic letter he signed in 1994, which resurfaced ahead of the State election.

The La Trobe University Students' Union is responsible for many Contact Student Services but its role has been considerably diminished as a consequence of Voluntary Student Unionism. There were previously three main student representative bodies on campus known as the La Trobe University Student Guild, The Student's Representative Council and the La Trobe Postgraduate Student's Association. The La Trobe University Student Representative Council, became the principal representative body on campus and a student advocacy group as well as student representatives for welfare, disability, women, queer, indigenous, environment, education and welfare and the Guild managed student services. In 2011 however, the Student's Representative Council, The La Trobe Postgraduate Students Association, The Students Guild and the university merged the three separate organisations into one body: The La Trobe Student Union.

From 2015, the LTSU saw a major diversity, inclusion and anti bullying campaign organised by Nathan Croft, Dean D'Angelo and Eshan Arya. Eshan Arya further campaigned and successfully fought for executive representation of international and South Asian students within the LTSU and introduced new position of people of colour officer in 2015. After the elections are carried out Urwah Khan Sherwani and Yashasvi Tandon secured this position with highest voting margin among seven positions. Since 2016, LTSU ticket called 'Unite' originally founded by the trio of Nathan, Dean and Eshan has won the union elections and held the office. Eshan Arya was also the first ever Indian President of the Union's International Students' Association associate body and the first Indian Post Graduate Officer to hold the position on multiple occasions. Daman Mann in 2017 became the first ever Indian origin General Secretary of the LTSU. In 2016, LTSU introduced a new position called 'Person of Colour'. This inaugural position was held Urwah Khan Sherwani and Yashasvi Tandon who secured this position with highest voting margin among seven positions. A later resolution was passed to change the name of the position to Ethnocultural Officer.

From 2011 - 2015 the LTSU was held by the NLS run ticket Stand Up! made up with a coalition of Socialist Alternative and other independent groups. At the 2015 LTSU Election a broad anti-Stand Up! coalition of Labor Unity, Greens, International Student groups, and independent groups that had previously run with Stand Up! swept all office bearing positions in the LTSU. Labor Unity's Nathan Croft was elected president for 2016 with a large majority.

At the 2017 Annual LTSU elections NLS only nominated for two positions.

Consistently young student politicians from La Trobe have gone on to hold positions within the National Union of Students (NUS). Previous LTSU members include 2013 LTSU President Claire Keys-Liley from NLS (2014 NUS Education Officer), 2014 LTSU President Rose Steele from NLS (2015 NUS President), Dean D'Angelo from Student Unity (2015 NUS Welfare Officer), Danica Cheesley from Socialist Alternative (2015 NUS Queer Officer), 2016 LTSU President Nathan Croft from Student Unity (2017 NUS General Secretary) and 2017 LTSU President Jacob Cripps from Student Unity (2018 NUS General Secretary).

Student Politics & Notable Events

SRC Election Postal Vote Scandal
During the 1995 SRC election, there was a major scandal involving postal ballots sent to Glenn College.  A group of four candidates associated with the Australian Labor Party contested the election as the "Tin Tin for NUS" ticket.  It was discovered that one of the students, Stephen Donnelly, had gained access to the postal ballots during the delivery process.  When challenged to explain their behavior, all four candidates withdrew their nominations.  The deputy returning officer writes that the candidates  Stephen Donnelly, Robert Larocca, Nigel Rhode and Robin Scott were charged with Dishonest Conduct and Interfering with Ballot Papers.  He escalated the matter to the Dean of Glenn College and then the University Secretary but found them disinterested and the matter was never formally prosecuted by the police.  Stephen Donnelly has subsequently become the Assistant State Secretary in the Victorian branch of the ALP.

2015 General Election 
The La Trobe Student Union was run by the 'Stand Up!' ticket, made up of members of the National Labor Students (NLS) from the Left Faction of the ALP until 2015.

At the 2015 annual elections a diverse ticket comprising Student Unity (SU) members from the ALP's Right Faction led by Dean D'Angelo, and various clubs and societies including the International Students Association (ISA) led by Eshan Arya, ousted the left group. The 'Unite' ticket won 58 percent of the vote electing Nathan Croft as the first Labor Right President at La Trobe University in decades.

Presidents of La Trobe Student Union

La Trobe Student Union (2011 onwards):
 2011 - Adrian MacMillian
 2012 - Clare Keyes Lilley
 2013 - Chris Wheeler
 2014 - Rose Steele
 2015 - Jasmine Ingram
 2016 - Nathan Croft
 2017 - Jake Cripps
 2018 - Abood Shehada
 2019 - Michael Iroeche
 2020 - Annabelle Romano
 2021 - Jake McGuinness
 2022 - Joel Blanch
 2023 - Monika Galovic 
 source: http://srclatrobe.org.au/?page_id=12

Attempted amalgamation and delayed 2020 election controversy
At the beginning of 2020, LTSU President Annabelle Romano and General Manager Elissa Khoury stated that the university had reached a position to only continue funding one student organisation beyond January 1, 2021, and that subsequently LTSU would pursue an amalgamation with the Bendigo Student Association (BSA), and the Wodonga Student Association, (WSA).

With this announcement in mind, the LTSU executive attempted to delay the annual elections, scheduled for late 2020, suggesting it was better to wait until after an amalgamation could be finalised before electing the incoming executive.

Amidst allegations that the elections were only being postponed for the benefit of the incumbent office bearers, questions were raised over whether the university administration had ever actually taken the position to only fund one student organisation.

In September 2020, just weeks before the annual election was scheduled to take place, LTSU Education Officer (Public Affairs) Stephanie Briese, revealed via an open letter that during an online all-student forum hosted by Vice-Chancellor Professor John Dewar and Deputy Vice-Chancellor Jessica Vanderlelie, it had been stated that La Trobe University had no intention to only fund one student organisation.

During the forum, Dewar asked Vanderlelie the rhetorical question "Now, Jess, are the student associations amalgamating because LTU will only fund one organisation?", to which Vanderlelie replied "No, so La Trobe is committed to funding however many student associations we have on our campuses, if that means there is more than one student association we will continue to fund more than one student association"

Despite these details not being confirmed until September, the LTSU Student Council voted at its August 31 meeting for an election to take place. As a result, the annual election took take place before October 14, 2020.

2022 General Election 
During 2022 the La Trobe Student Union was run by the 'Change' ticket, made up of both members of the National Labor Students (NLS) from the Left Faction of the ALP and Young Progressive Unity (LPU) a splinter grouping former Right Faction.

The 2022 election saw the incumbent ticket 'Change' run again with the ticket 'Ignite' as the oppositional ticket. The oppositional ticket consisted of members of the Shop, Distributive and Allied Employees Association (SDA) a faction of Labor Student Unity (Unity) one of the major factions in Labor Right. Along with the SDA the ticket leadership was focused on allying with many clubs along with the LTSU Queer Collective to create not only the idea of diversity but progressivism. The election resulted in 'Change' maintaining most positions winning 68% of the overall vote, voter turnout for the election was 8.9% of eligible voters (1745 votes).

Election history

References

External links
 La Trobe Student Union)

Students' unions in Australia
La Trobe University